Abdul Latiff bin Abdul Rahman is a Malaysian politician. He is also a member of Malaysian Islamic Party (PAS), a component party in the Perikatan Nasional (PN) government coalition. He has served as Member of Parliament (MP) for Kuala Krai since May 2018. He served as Member of the Kelantan State Legislative Assembly (MLA) for Mengkebang from March 2008 to May 2018.

Election results

Honours
  :
  Companion of the Order of the Defender of the Realm (JMN) (2021)

References

Living people
People from Kelantan
Malaysian people of Malay descent
Malaysian Muslims
Malaysian Islamic Party politicians
Members of the Dewan Rakyat
Members of the Kelantan State Legislative Assembly
21st-century Malaysian politicians
Year of birth missing (living people)